SIC Internacional is SIC's international channel, which officially launched in September 1997 in France and has since expanded throughout the world. SIC Internacional is aimed at Portuguese viewers who live abroad and features programming from SIC and its various other channels. Programming includes news, entertainment, talkshows, series, sports and much more. It also features exclusive coverage of Portuguese Liga football matches every weekend.

SIC Internacional is for the Portuguese migrant communities and available via cable and satellite in Africa (Angola, Mozambique & South Africa), Europe (France, Switzerland & Luxembourg), The Americas (Brazil, United States & Canada) and Oceania (Australia and New Zealand) via Luso Vision., and Coming Soon in Japan, Macau, Timor Leste, Thailand, Singapore and Malaysia (6 Countries will be Launches It On Asia Feed) It operates 24/7.

In North America, SIC Internacional is not available directly but rather via local Portuguese television channels.

In Canada it is relayed via FPTV and in the United States via SPT TV. These relays run alongside local productions aimed at the communities in the respective countries.

References

External links
 Official Site 

International broadcasters
Television networks in Portugal
Television channels in Angola
Television channels in Mozambique
Television stations in Portugal
Portuguese-language television stations
1997 establishments in Portugal
Television channels and stations established in 1997
Sociedade Independente de Comunicação